The Welsh National Badminton Championships is a tournament organized to crown the best badminton players in Wales since 1938.

However, until 1960 there was only mixed doubles competition, in 1960 the number of competitions increased to three, with men's doubles and women's doubles. One year later for the first time all five competitions were played. In 1977 started the team competition and junior championships. 

There are already international championships of Wales since 1928.

Previous winners

References
  
 

National badminton championships
1938 establishments in Wales
Badminton in Wales
Recurring sporting events established in 1938